Particle beam cooling is the process of improving the quality of particle beams produced by particle accelerators, by reducing the emittance. Techniques for particle beam cooling include:

 Stochastic cooling
 Electron cooling
 Ionization cooling
 Laser cooling
 Radiation damping
 Buffer-gas cooling within RF quadrupoles

References

Accelerator physics